Judd Buchanan,  (born July 25, 1929) is a Canadian former politician and businessman.

After a career in the life insurance industry working for London Life, Buchanan, born in Edmonton, Alberta, was elected to the House of Commons of Canada in the 1968 election as the Liberal Member of Parliament for London West.

He served as a Parliamentary Secretary in the early 1970s, first to the Minister of Indian Affairs and Northern Development, and then to the Finance Minister.

He was  appointed to the Cabinet by Prime Minister Pierre Trudeau in 1974 as Minister of Indian Affairs. In 1976, he was moved to the position of Minister of Public Works, and served concurrently as Minister of State for Science and Technology. In 1978, he left these files to become President of the Treasury Board until the defeat of the Trudeau government in the 1979 election.

When the Liberals returned to power in the 1980 election, Buchanan was not returned to Cabinet and he resigned his seat in the House of Commons in August 1980 to return to the private sector.

Following his political career, Buchanan entered the tourism industry, leading Silver Star Mountain Resorts Ltd.  In 1995, he helped create the Canadian Tourism Commission which works with government to promote Canada as a tourist destination. He served as its chairman until his retirement in 2002.

In 2000, he was made an Officer of the Order of Canada.

Archives 
There is a Judd Buchanan fonds at Library and Archives Canada.

References

External links

1929 births
Living people
Canadian Ministers of Indian Affairs and Northern Development
Liberal Party of Canada MPs
Members of the 20th Canadian Ministry
Members of the House of Commons of Canada from Ontario
Members of the King's Privy Council for Canada
Members of the United Church of Canada
Officers of the Order of Canada
Politicians from Edmonton
Politicians from London, Ontario